Rajaton is a Finnish a cappella ensemble, founded in Helsinki in 1997. The Finnish word rajaton means "boundless", to indicate the breadth of their repertoire, from sacred classical to near Europop.
Rajaton performs primarily in Finland but also tours around Europe and the rest of the world, having performed in over 25 countries.

In 2005, Rajaton album sales reached 100,000 worldwide. They have earned eight gold records in total, with Rajaton Sings ABBA reaching platinum (30,000) and Joulu reaching double platinum (60,000).

Rajaton mainly performs a cappella, music written or arranged by members of the ensemble. Most lyrics are taken from poetry and from a collection of Finnish folk poetry Kanteletar.

Members
The six members of the group are:
Soprano: Essi Wuorela
Mezzo-Soprano: Aili Ikonen (was: Virpi Moskari until 2017)
Alto: Soila Sariola
Tenor: Hannu Lepola
Baritone: Ahti Paunu
Bass: Jussi Chydenius

Discography

Nova (2000)
Boundless (2001)
Sanat (2002)
Joulu (2003)
Kevät (2005)
Out of Bounds (2006)
Rajaton sings ABBA (2006)
Maa (2007)
Rajaton sings Queen with Lahti Symphony Orchestra (2008)
Best of Rajaton 1999-2009 (2009)
Tarinoita (2010)
Jouluyö (2011)
Suomen Lasten Lauluja (2012)
Salaisuus (2016)
Tuhansien Laulujen Maa (2017)
Ja niin on taasen joulu (2019)

References

External links

 official Rajaton website
 The Recorded A Cappella Review Board—reviews of Rajaton CDs
 Rajaton Fan Club—free forum for Rajaton discussion and information

Finnish musical groups
Professional a cappella groups
Sibelius Academy alumni